

Denmark
South Greenland – Carl Peter Holbøll, Inspector of South Greenland (1828–1856)

Portugal
Angola – 
 Pedro Alexandrino da Cunha, Governor-General of Angola (1845–1848)
 Adrião da Silveiro Pinto, Governor-General of Angola (1848–1851)

United Kingdom
Malta – Richard More O'Ferrall, Governor of Malta (1847–1851)
New South Wales – Lieutenant Colonel Charles FitzRoy, Governor of New South Wales (1846–1855)
South Australia 
 Lieutenant-Colonel Frederick Holt Robe, Governor of South Australia (1845–1848)
 Sir Henry Fox Young, Governor of South Australia (1848–1854)
 Western Australia
 Lieutenant-Colonel Frederick Irwin, Acting Governor of Western Australia (1847–1848)
 Captain Charles Fitzgerald, Governor of Western Australia (1848–1855)

Colonial governors
Colonial governors
1848